Ruthiyai Junction railway station is an important railway station in Guna district, Madhya Pradesh. Its code is RTA. It serves Ruthiyai village. The station consists of two platforms. It lacks many facilities including water and sanitation. All Passenger, Express and Superfast trains halt here. Many Freight trains also pass through this station.

References

IRCTC's new website launched

Railway stations in Guna district
Bhopal railway division
Railway junction stations in Madhya Pradesh